Greg Castiglioni is an Italian born, West End musical theatre performer based in London, England.  Critic Dan Parker of Broadway Baby wrote of Castiglioni's portrayal of "Baalthazar" in Love Birds, "Vocally, his dramatic vibrato and range is enticing to hear, adding to his impeccable comic timing."

Early life
Greg Castiglioni was born in Milan and grew up by lake Como in Italy.  He is fluent in four languages (English, Italian, German and French) and has a degree in law from the University of Westminster. After receiving a full scholarship from The Stage newspaper, Castiglioni trained at Mountview Conservatoire in London, England.

Career
Greg Castiglioni has performed in musicals, plays and concerts both in the UK and internationally as well as in studio recordings both as a solo performer and for movie soundtracks. Notable credits include Emcee in the English Theatre Frankfurt’s production of Cabaret, "Thomas Andrews" in Titanic London, UK tour & Canadian productions and Count Fosco in the first revival of Andrew Lloyd Webber'''s The Woman in White which earned him an Offie award nomination. Further credits include: the "Russian Tenor" in the Chichester Festival Theatre's production of Fiddler on the Roof; the U.K./European tour of Cats as "Gus the Theatre Cat"; the 25th anniversary UK tour of Phantom of the Opera as "M Reyer” and understudying "the Phantom" and "Piangi"; the 2006 west end revival of Evita directed by Michael Grandage as "Magaldi"; Starlight Express as "Rusty" (alternate); The Importance Of Being Earnest as "Algernon Moncrieff"; Les Misérables as "Thénardier"  (understudy); Company as "Paul";"Pluto" in Offenbach's Orpheus in the Underworld and "Luiz" in Gilbert and Sullivan's The Gondoliers (Opera della Luna)  Love Birds creating the role of "Baalthazar"A Spoonful of Sherman as "Featured Performer in the original cast";  Lend Me A Tenor: The Musical'' for the world premiere; and as a featured soloist in "Hair" at the Oslo Spektrum.

In 2020, Castiglioni will act in the UK/Ireland tour of “ The Phantom of the Opera” in the role of Piangi.

External sources
 gregcastiglioni.com

References

Alumni of the Mountview Academy of Theatre Arts
English operatic baritones
English male musical theatre actors
English male stage actors
Living people
English people of Italian descent
Year of birth missing (living people)